Robert Samuel Fabry, as a student at the University of Chicago worked on COMIT II and MADBUG, an interactive debugger for MAD both on CTSS.

Later while a computer science professor at the University of California, Berkeley, conceived of the idea of obtaining DARPA funding for a radically improved version of AT&T Unix and started the Computer Systems Research Group.

See also 

 Unix File System

References

External links
Bob Fabry, PhD, N6EK - Heard Island Expedition 1997

BSD people
Living people
University of California, Berkeley faculty
1940 births